Thirukkural Payanam is a 2017-2018 Tamil language Quiz reality TV show, that airs on Vendhar TV from 5 November 2017 to 28 January 2018 on every Sunday at 7:00PM (IST) for 13 Episodes. The show about Tirukkuṛaḷ for school and college students in 10 zones: Puducherry, Nellai, Madurai, Chennai, Thiruvarur, Salem, Trichy, Kovai, Vellore and Erode witnessing participation of 1524 students in all.

Synopsis
The show has 4 levels, level 1: Juniors (Classes: 6-8), level 2: Seniors (Classes: 9 & 10), level 3: Super Seniors (Classes: 11 & 12) and level 4: College levels across Tamil Nadu and Puducherry. The contest saw 40 emerging as finalists.

Winners
 1st: Sobika
 2rd: Selvaraj
 3rd: K. Karthik

References

External links
 Vendhar TV Website 
 Vendhar TV on YouTube

Vendhar TV television series
2017 Tamil-language television series debuts
2010s Tamil-language television series
Tamil-language quiz shows
Tamil-language reality television series
Tamil-language talk shows
Tamil-language television shows
2018 Tamil-language television series endings